Severi Paajanen (born 23 October 1986) is a Finnish former footballer.

External links
fcinter.com Profile

References

1986 births
Living people
Footballers from Turku
Finnish footballers
Association football midfielders
FC Inter Turku players
Åbo IFK players
Veikkausliiga players
Ykkönen players
Kakkonen players